Enrique Javier Carreño Salvago (born 27 November 1986) is a Spanish footballer who plays as a forward.

Club career
Born in Utrera, Province of Seville, Carreño played his first years as a senior with Sevilla FC, but appeared almost exclusively for their reserves in the third division. He split the 2007–08 season between two clubs in the same league, CD Alcalá and AD Alcorcón, on loan.

On 9 January 2010, Carreño made his debut for Sevilla's first team, coming on as a substitute for Diego Perotti in the second half of a 1–2 La Liga home loss against Racing de Santander. In the summer, he left the Andalusians and signed for Académica de Coimbra in Portugal, being rarely used during the campaign. 
 
Carreño moved clubs and countries again in the 2011 off-season, joining Diósgyőri VTK in the Hungarian top tier. He played his official match on 16 July, featuring ten minutes in a 4–1 home win over Zalaegerszegi TE.

Returned to his country in the 2012 January transfer window, Carreño competed solely in lower league football. The exception to this was the 2017–18 campaign, when he appeared for Europa F.C. in the Gibraltar Premier Division.

References

External links

1986 births
Living people
People from Utrera
Sportspeople from the Province of Seville
Spanish footballers
Footballers from Andalusia
Association football forwards
La Liga players
Segunda División players
Segunda División B players
Tercera División players
Sevilla Atlético players
CD Alcalá players
AD Alcorcón footballers
Sevilla FC players
Real Zaragoza B players
Huracán Valencia CF players
CE L'Hospitalet players
CD Guijuelo footballers
CP Cacereño players
CD Badajoz players
CE Sabadell FC footballers
Primeira Liga players
Associação Académica de Coimbra – O.A.F. players
Nemzeti Bajnokság I players
Diósgyőri VTK players
Gibraltar Premier Division players
Europa F.C. players
Spain youth international footballers
Spanish expatriate footballers
Expatriate footballers in Portugal
Expatriate footballers in Hungary
Expatriate footballers in Gibraltar
Spanish expatriate sportspeople in Portugal
Spanish expatriate sportspeople in Hungary
Spanish expatriate sportspeople in Gibraltar